Aethria analis is a moth of the subfamily Arctiinae. It was described by Schaus in 1910. It is found in Peru.

References

Moths described in 1910
Arctiinae
Moths of South America